Marvin Pfründer (born 28 January 1994) is a Swiss footballer who most recently played for FC Köniz.

Career
Pfründer returned to FC Köniz in the summer 2018 for the second time. He left the club at the end of the season again.

Honours

FC Vaduz
Liechtenstein Football Cup: 2016-17

References

Swiss men's footballers
Swiss Super League players
1994 births
Living people
FC Vaduz players
Association football defenders
People from Weinfelden District
U.C. Sampdoria players
Grasshopper Club Zürich players
FC Köniz players
Swiss expatriate sportspeople in Italy
Swiss expatriate sportspeople in Liechtenstein
Expatriate footballers in Italy
Expatriate footballers in Liechtenstein
Sportspeople from Thurgau